Timo Ahmaoja (born August 8, 1978) is a Finnish former professional ice hockey player.  He played in the SM-liiga for JYP, Lukko, KalPa, HIFK, SaiPa, Pelicans, HPK and Ässät.  He was drafted 172nd overall by the Mighty Ducks of Anaheim in the 1996 NHL Entry Draft.

External links

1978 births
Living people
Ässät players
Finnish ice hockey defencemen
Frisk Asker Ishockey players
HIFK (ice hockey) players
HPK players
JYP Jyväskylä players
KalPa players
Lukko players
Anaheim Ducks draft picks
SaiPa players
Stavanger Oilers players
Sportspeople from Jyväskylä
20th-century Finnish people
21st-century Finnish people